Yi-ngo (Pattani Malay: ยือรีงา) is a district (amphoe) of Narathiwat province, southern Thailand.

Geography
Neighboring districts are (from the north clockwise): Bacho, Mueang Narathiwat, Ra-ngae, and Rueso.

History
Yi-ngo was originally a district in Sai Buri Province. In 1909 it was reassigned to Bang Nara Province, present-day Narathiwat Province.

Administration

Central administration 
Yi-ngo district is divided into six sub-districts (tambons), which are further subdivided into 40 administrative villages (mubans).

Local administration 
There is one sub-district municipality (thesaban tambon) in the district:
 Yi-ngo consisting of parts of sub-district Yi-ngo.

There are six subdistrict administrative organizations (SAO) in the district:
 Yi-ngo consisting of parts of sub-district Yi-ngo.
 Lahan consisting of sub-district Lahan.
 Cho Bo consisting of sub-district Cho Bo.
 Lubo Baya consisting of sub-district Lubo Baya.
 Lubo Buesa consisting of sub-district Lubo Buesa.
 Tapoyo consisting of sub-district Tapoyo.

References

External links
amphoe.com (Thai)

Districts of Narathiwat province